Eagle Harbor is an unincorporated community and census-designated place located on the north side of the Keweenaw Peninsula within Eagle Harbor Township, Keweenaw County in the U.S. State of Michigan. Its population was 69 as of the 2020 census. M-26 passes through this community. This hamlet was especially popular with the sailors in days past, as it had a good steamboat landing and is about equally distant from Sault Sainte Marie, Michigan, and Duluth, Minnesota. It was the first stop for supplies for the many boats on Lake Superior.

The settlement of Eagle Harbor is located on the tip of Michigan's farthest county, closer to the North Pole than the City of Quebec, Canada.

Demographics

Etymology 
This community received its name from the beautiful harbor and the many eagles that were then in the region. It has an excellent sand beach on a large bay some four miles in circumference. Additionally, the harbor is irregularly shaped about four-thousand-nine-hundred feet long and one-thousand-one-hundred feet in width. With a natural opening, its entrance is on the west side of a large rock that appears above the surface of the water about forty rods from the east cape of the harbor. There is a reef of sunken rocks off the mouth of the bay, but the harbor may be entered from the north-west or north-east, between the reef and the capes, the opening being about one-thousand-five-hundred feet wide.

Climate
Eagle Harbor has a humid continental climate (Dfb). Summers are short but warm with cool nights. Winters are long, cold, and very snowy due to lake effect snow from Lake Superior. Precipitation is relatively uniform year round.

History

Early history 

Edward Taylor and a group of men came to Eagle Harbor prior to the winter of 1842 and 1843, spending the winter on the lake shore between Copper Harbor and Eagle River. In the year of 1844, Taylor returned to Eagle Harbor and constructed a tavern out of logs, which later burned down on an unspecified date. The location in which the tavern sat is now the site of the present-day Lake Breeze Hotel. Taylor then erected yet another saloon and built additions to his building as more space was eventually required. This, too, also burned down.

On January 17, 1852, the new wood-frame dining room and kitchen were saved from the devouring flames by strenuous efforts and the favorable turn of the wind. The front of the hotel was soon re-erected by James Bawden and the business was again opened to the public. With a grand total of thirty-six rooms, the Eagle Harbor Hotel was the largest hotel in all of Keweenaw County.

James Rasewarn purchased the Eagle Harbor Hotel in the year of 1881. He was born in Cornwall, England, on July 7, 1835, and was brought up by a miner. He came to the United States in 1854, working in New Jersey for one year. In 1855, he moved to the Lake Superior region and worked for eight months at the Flint Steel mine, as well as in the Douglass Houghton, Toltec and Evergreen mines. After a brief four-year trip to England, Brazil and South America, he returned to the United States and located at the Central mine, where he worked for three and a half years as a copper miner, and then worked at the Copper Falls mine for eight years. During the fall of 1880, he moved to Eagle Harbor, and in June 1881 leased the Eagle Harbor Hotel, purchasing it during the same year.

The area was first occupied by the Eagle Harbor Mining Company, who landed a party of men here during the summer of 1845, a man by the name of Sprague being its agent. On October 17, 1845, Franklin Hopkins arrived with thirteen men and resided within a tent. He arrived at Copper Harbor the night that Dr. Douglass Houghton drowned, and had to remain there for four days because of the memorable storm of October 13, 1845, which deprived the copper region of its most able and accomplished explorer and surveyor.

Hopkins was one of the earliest pioneers of the Lake Superior region, and an early mining agent. He was born in Trenton, New York, on November 28, 1817. He moved to the Lower Peninsula of Michigan in 1845. He first worked at the North American mine and then at the Eagle Harbor mine, working as a mining carpenter, staying with that company for two years. He then went to the Lower, Peninsula, returning in 1848 when he was appointed carpenter to the Methodist Indian Mission at L'Anse. He completed the trip to L'Anse on foot and after fifteen months left the Mission, as he did not particularly enjoy that position.

Hopkins then went to the old Northwest mine, which was later known as the Conglomerate, and continued working at that mine for two years. He then served two years as the agent of the Isle Royale mine at Houghton, moving to take charge of the Pontiac mine for a short time. He then kept the Phoenix House at Eagle River. It was during this time that he lost his wife and one child on the wrecked steamer PS Lady Elgin, on September 8, 1860. He became connected with the dock and warehouse business and thus became one of its most active citizens.

During the community's earliest time, there was only one house in the area, and it was constructed of rough logs and covered with "shakes" which are thin strips split from logs. By 1846, Hiram Joy was tending to a log constructed boardinghouse in Eagle Harbor, which was purchased by Charles Kuntz in 1849. At this time there were four buildings  in the town. Charles Kuntz was the village blacksmith and was born in Germany, in the village of Wennenbergerhoff, on November 25, 1822. He emigrated to the United States in 1844, landing at New Orleans where he spent six months, moving up to the northern states where he became engaged as a blacksmith at the Northwest mine, remaining there for two years. He then did blacksmith work at the Copper Falls mine during the years of 1847, 1848 and 1850. In 1849 he moved to Eagle harbor, where he opened a blacksmith shop and maintained the hotel. He was known as a large real estate owner and had quite a few buildings. He was also Under Sheriff for Houghton County, and upon the organization of Michigan's new Keweenaw County, he was elected as Sheriff of that county, being an efficient peace officer.

Recent history
The community of Eagle Harbor was listed as a newly organized census-designated place for the 2010 census, meaning it now has officially defined boundaries and population statistics for the first time.

References 

Unincorporated communities in Keweenaw County, Michigan
Unincorporated communities in Michigan
Census-designated places in Michigan
Census-designated places in Keweenaw County, Michigan
Michigan populated places on Lake Superior
Populated places established in 1844
1844 establishments in Michigan